2008 Belarusian First League was the eighteenth season of 2nd level football championship in Belarus. It started in April and ended in November 2008.

Team changes from 2007 season
Three top teams of last season (Savit Mogilev, Granit Mikashevichi and Lokomotiv Minsk) were promoted to Belarusian Premier League. Due to expansion of Premier League, the promoted teams were replaced by only one team that finished at the bottom of 2007 Belarusian Premier League table (Minsk).

One team that finished at the bottom of 2007 season table (Zvezda-BGU Minsk) relegated to the Second League. To compensate for the Premier League expansion, they were replaced by three best teams of 2007 Second League (PMC Postavy, Lida and Spartak Shklov).

Mozyr changed their name to Slavia Mozyr prior to the season.

Teams and locations

League table

Top goalscorers

See also
2008 Belarusian Premier League
2007–08 Belarusian Cup
2008–09 Belarusian Cup

External links
RSSSF

Belarusian First League seasons
2
Belarus
Belarus